Amanda Janes Keen (born 15 January 1978) is a former English tennis player who competed on the WTA Tour. She twice competed at Wimbledon and had a career-best ranking of no. 207.

Keen is the daughter of Christine Truman, winner of the 1959 French Open. Since her retirement from the tennis tour, she has been a coach and also teaches English at a high school.

ITF finals

Singles (4–2)

Doubles (1–0)

References

External links
 
 
 
 Former British number two female tennis player Amanda Janes on Wimbledon, the cost of pursuing dreams and family life

1978 births
English female tennis players
Universiade medalists in tennis
Living people
British female tennis players
Tennis people from Greater London
Universiade bronze medalists for Great Britain
Medalists at the 2001 Summer Universiade